Princess Victor of Hohenlohe-Langenburg (Laura Williamina Seymour; 17 December 1832 – 13 February 1912) was a British-born aristocrat whose marriage to a German prince naturalised in England made her a kinswoman of the British Royal Family and a member of the royal court.

Ancestry
Laura Williamina Seymour was a daughter of Admiral Sir George Seymour and his wife, Georgiana Berkeley, a granddaughter of the 4th Earl of Berkeley and a great-granddaughter of the 2nd Duke of Richmond. Paternally, she descended in unbroken male line from the Seymours (originally, St. Maur) who belonged to the gentry of the 12th century, acquired considerable landed wealth by the marriage of Sir Roger de St. Maur to the baronial co-heiress Cecily Berkeley, and were raised to peerage in 1536 as Viscounts Beauchamp. Laura's direct ancestor, Edward Seymour, 1st Duke of Somerset, was the eldest brother of Henry VIII's queen consort, Jane Seymour, and had himself declared Lord Protector of England during the minority of their son, King Edward VI. The Dukedom of Somerset and the Marquessate of Hertford, eventually devolved upon her branch of the Seymour family. Laura Seymour descended three times from Charles II of England and once from James II of England (although severed from the Royal Family by bars sinister). Furthermore, she descended from Charles I Louis, Elector Palatine and from Maurice, Prince of Orange also by mistresses.

Marriage
Nonetheless, her noble ancestors in the United Kingdom did not suffice to permit Laura to contract an equal marriage with a cadet of a German mediatised family of princely rank in 19th century Europe. Almost two weeks before her morganatic marriage to Prince Victor of Hohenlohe-Langenburg (a half-nephew of Queen Victoria who had served under her father's military command) on 26 January 1861, she was created Countess von Gleichen by Ernst II, Duke of Saxe-Coburg and Gotha.

When the Countess von Gleichen's brother, Francis, inherited his cousin's Marquessate of Hertford in 1870, the Queen granted her the rank and style of the daughter of a marquess by Royal Warrant of Precedence, entitling her to prefix Lady to her name. However, she continued to use her comital title until 15 December 1885, when it was gazetted in the Court Circular that the Queen had granted her permission to share, within the British Empire, her husband's princely title. Henceforth she was known as HSH Princess Victor of Hohenlohe-Langenburg, although this changed neither her legal rank nor her title in the German Empire. In accordance with the original Coburg grant, her children were also Count/Countess von Gleichen and, although granted unique precedence before the daughters and younger sons of English dukes in 1913, they never received authorisation to share their parents' princely style at the Court of St. James's, and were known by their comital title (dropping, however, the von) until George V Anglicised their style in 1917, along with the styles of members of his own family who bore German titles. Princess Victor did not live to undergo that demotion in titulature.

Children
Laura Seymour and Prince Victor had four children, the daughters becoming notable for their artistic endeavors and cultural patronage:

Lady Feodora (Feo) Georgina Maud Gleichen (20 December 1861 – 22 February 1922); sculptor.
Lord Albert Edward Wilfred Gleichen (15 January 1863 – 13 December 1937); soldier, married Hon. Sylvia Edwardes on 2 July 1910. 
Lady Victoria (Valda) Alice Leopoldina Ada Laura Gleichen (28 November 1868 – 10 September 1951); singer, married Lt.-Col. Percy Machell on 5 December 1905. 
Lady Helena Emily Gleichen (1 February 1873 – 28 January 1947); artist.

References

1832 births
1912 deaths
Victor of Hohenlohe-Langenburg, Princess
Morganatic spouses of German royalty
Laura
Laura